Kentucky Route 713 (KY 713) is a  state highway in Montgomery County and western Menifee County, Kentucky, that runs from U.S. Route 460 (US 460) north of Grassy Lick to US 460 again in western Frenchburg via Grassy Lick, Mount Sterling, Spencer, Walkers Crossing, Means, Coburn, and Fagan.

Major intersections

References

0713
0713
0713
Mount Sterling, Kentucky micropolitan area